Karel Hendrik Voous (23 June 1920, Huizen – 31 January 2002, Huizen) was a Dutch ornithologist and author.

He was Secretary-General (1966–1970) and Honorary President (1990–1994) of the International Ornithological Committee.

Bibliography

Books in English
On the history of the distribution of the genus Dendrocopos (1947)
Birds observed and collected during the whaling expeditions of the "Willem Barendsz" in the Antarctic, 1946–1947 and 1947–1948 (1950)
Owls of the Northern Hemisphere
List of Recent Holarctic Bird Species

Contributions
The EBCC Atlas of European Breeding Birds, T & A D Poyser, 1997  (foreword)

Books in Dutch
Afwijkende populatie koolmezen
Phylloscopus Bonelli Bonelli in Nederland Gevangen
Roofvogels en Uilen van Europa

References

1920 births
2002 deaths
Dutch ornithologists
People from Huizen
20th-century Dutch zoologists